Michael Christopher "Topex" Robinson (born December 25, 1974) is a Filipino professional basketball coach and former player who serves as the head coach of the De La Salle Green Archers of the University Athletic Association of the Philippines (UAAP). He last coached the Phoenix Super LPG Fuel Masters of the Philippine Basketball Association (PBA). He was drafted forty-fourth overall by the Tanduay Rhum Masters.

Playing career 
Robinson played point guard. He played for Montaña in the PBL and was then signed as a free agent by Yeng Guiao in 2003 to play for Red Bull Thunder as a backup point guard.

After the 2008 PBA Fiesta Conference ended, the Red Bull Barako waived him. He was immediately signed by the Purefoods Tender Juicy Giants for the 2008-09 PBA season. During the 2010 PBA Fiesta Conference, he was signed by Alaska. He also first played for the San Juan Knights in the MBA.

Coaching career 
Robinson was named coach of the RnW Pacific Pipes team in the PBA D-League during the 2011 PBA D-League Foundation Cup, leading the team to the quarterfinals. In June 2011, Robinson was named coach of the San Sebastian Stags. After the Stags lost to the San Beda Red Lions in the Finals of the NCAA Season 87, Robinson led the Stags to the 2011 Philippine Collegiate Championship, beating the 4-time UAAP champions and 2-time Philippine Collegiate Championship champions the Ateneo Blue Eagles in 2 games. In 2012, he returned to PBA as he joined the Alaska Aces as an assistant coach to Luigi Trillo and Alex Compton from 2012–2017.

Coaching record

Collegiate record

Professional career

References

External links 
Player Profile

1974 births
Living people
Alaska Aces (PBA) players
Filipino men's basketball players
San Sebastian Stags basketball players
Sportspeople from Olongapo
Basketball players from Zambales
Magnolia Hotshots players
Point guards
Barako Bull Energy Boosters players
Phoenix Super LPG Fuel Masters coaches
Filipino men's basketball coaches
Tanduay Rhum Masters draft picks
Alaska Aces (PBA) coaches
Lyceum Pirates basketball coaches
San Sebastian Stags basketball coaches